Çaltı (literally "thorny tree" or just "thorn") is a Turkish word that may refer to several places in Turkey:

 Çaltı, a town in the district of Söğüt, Bilecik Province
 Çaltı, Ayvacık
 Çaltı, Çardak
 Çaltı, Çine, a village in the district of Çine, Aydın Province
 Çaltı, Gündoğmuş, a village in the district of Gündoğmuş, Antalya Province
 Çaltı, İliç
 Çaltı, Kumluca, a village in the district of Kumluca, Antalya Province
 Çaltı, Refahiye
 Çaltı, Vezirköprü, a village in the district of Vezirköprü, Samsun Province